The Azerbaijan women's national handball team is the national team of Azerbaijan. It takes part in international team handball competitions. 

The team has yet to participate in a European or World championship.
Gold medal to Handball at Handball at the 2017 Islamic Solidarity Games.

References

External links
Official website on eurohandball.com

National team
Women's national handball teams
Handball